Odd Job is a 2016 French comedy film directed by Pascal Chaumeil.

Plot 
Jacques lives in a small town where all the inhabitants were put on straw stock following a dismissal. The factory closed, his girlfriend is gone and debts accumulate. So when the Mafia bookmaker corner him, asking him to kill his wife, Jacques gladly accepts.

Cast 

 Romain Duris as Jacques
 Michel Blanc as Gardot
 Alice Belaïdi as Anita
 Gustave Kervern as Tom
 Alex Lutz as Brecht
 Charlie Dupont as Jeff
 Patrick Descamps as Walter
 Philippe Grand'Henry as Carl
 Iván Marcos as Jaime
  as Mulot
 Gael Soudron as Pierrot
 Carole Trevoux as Katie

Production 
This is the last film Pascal Chaumeil directed, before he died on 27 August 2015.

References

External links 
 
 

French comedy films
2016 comedy films
2016 films
Films directed by Pascal Chaumeil
Gaumont Film Company films
Films based on American novels
2010s French films
2010s French-language films